Annagoo Taleex naal which in Somali literally means Residing in Taleh, is an August 11, 1913 poem in the Somali language by Ismail Mire which chronicles life at Taleh and the killing of colonial figurehead Richard Corfield. The poem was created two days after the death of Richard Corfield at the hands of Ibraahin Xoorane and Axmed Aarey.

The poem narrates the battle of Ruuga in the third person perspective of Tuurre, a horse owned by Ismail Mire, and narrates how the spoils of war and the belongings of Richard Corfield were brought by the Darawiish to the town of Buhoodle and to the far east of Sool province to be distributed there.

Poem

Ethics and etiquette
The first decimal of verses speak about the ethics and etiquette of Taleh. It states the peripheries of Taleh were tallied to a number of seven thousand Darawiish:

The next few verses speak the ethics present in the city of Taleh during colonial times, such as about norms when distributing bullets among Darawiish, etiquette among the ranks, the utensils used in their ranks. These earliest verses as well as the final verses demonstrate the anthropomorphic manner in which the Darawiish treated their horses. The poem further extolls the merits of ransacking the belongings and assets of egocentric overlords, and in particular that of what it describes as the authoritarian and dictatorial Richard Corfield.

Preparation
The second decimal of verses speak about preparation for battle with colonialists:

Killing of Richard Corfield
The third decimal of verses speaks about killing Richard Corfield and seizing the belongings of Corfield and his party:

Aftermath
The fourth decimal of verses related the aftermath of the Ruuga (Dul Madooba) battle and states that the spoils of  war seized from Corfield were distributed in Buuhoodle and the Tagaabeeye outskirts of the town of Carooley in Taleex district and the rest in Taleex itself.

By the end of the poem, Ismail Mire coins the term Tima soohanlow, meaning "braided hair" to describe his war-horse Tuurre.

Response poem: Beyond these voices
In response to the death of Richard Corfield, and in response to the Darawiish poems, the British war correspondent Francis Prevost published a book on the life of Richard Corfield, as well as a poem called Beyond these Voices, as a counter to the mocks of Darawiish poems. The first few lines of the poem commemorating Richard Corfield's death are as follows:

References

1913 poems